The 2014–15 season was the 135th season of competitive association football in England.

Promotion and relegation

Pre-season

National teams

England national football team

2014 FIFA World Cup

UEFA Euro 2016 qualifying

International Friendlies

England women's national football team

2015 FIFA Women's World Cup qualification (UEFA)

UEFA competitions

2014–15 UEFA Champions League

Play-off Round

|}

Group stage

Group B

Group D

Group E

Group G

Knockout phase

Round of 16

Quarter-finals

Semi-finals

2014–15 UEFA Europa League

Qualifying rounds

League season

Premier League 

Despite criticism about their style of play, Chelsea regained the Premier League title after five years and handed manager José Mourinho his first title in his second spell back at the club. In addition, similar to the club's first season under Mourinho in 2004, the Blues also won the League Cup. Manchester City came second; whilst the highest scorers in the league, they never looked like defending their title. A large winless spell in January, not helped by powerhouse midfielder Yaya Touré heading to the Africa Cup of Nations saw their title defense effectively end in mid-March. Arsenal finished third, but missed out on the chance to take the runners-up spot, which was largely owed to a failure to score at home three times in their last six games. In spite of this, they retained the FA Cup title. Manchester United took the final spot for the Champions League, securing a return to the elite competition in Louis van Gaal's first season as manager, despite several defeats that included a shock 5–3 defeat to Leicester City and a 4–0 thrashing at Milton Keynes Dons in the League Cup.

Tottenham Hotspur's first season under Mauricio Pochettino saw the impressive emergence of young striker Harry Kane, but was also blighted by the issues of the previous season as their defensive woes continued; because of this, their Champions League hopes evaporated by early March. Liverpool endured a turbulent season as they struggled to adjust to life without controversial striker Luis Suárez, whilst also being without Daniel Sturridge for large portions of the campaign due to injury. Having stood 12th in late November with just 14 points, the team rallied after New Year's Day as they mounted a late Champions League attempt, with a focus more on defense than goals and impressively made the semi-finals of both club competitions, but ultimately fell short overall. In spite of these issues, however, both Spurs and Liverpool secured Europa League spots.

Southampton were tipped by many for relegation following the loss of Pochettino and many key players over the summer, but they exceeded all expectations by challenging for the Champions League, their challenge continuing into April until a poor run of form against relegation battlers saw them slip out of the race. In spite of this, manager Ronald Koeman received universal praise for his work at the club in his first season and because of Arsenal's FA Cup win, they qualified for the Europa League. Swansea secured their best points total in Garry Monk's first full season, becoming another club to exceed expectations and even complete league doubles over Manchester United and Arsenal, whilst Stoke finished ninth, securing their best points total in the top flight.

Rounding out the top ten were Crystal Palace, who were tipped to struggle following the departure of Tony Pulis just two days before the start of the season; former boss Neil Warnock returned for a second spell, but only lasted four months before being sacked with the club facing another relegation battle. The surprise managerial appointment of former player Alan Pardew saw the Eagles rocket up into mid-table and ultimately survive, securing their highest ever Premier League finish. Another surprise saw pre-season relegation favourites Leicester City achieve survival against all the odds. Despite a reasonable start that included a famous 5–3 victory over Manchester United, their form dropped and they fell to the bottom of the table in November. With relegation looking likely at the beginning of April, the Foxes suddenly came to life and secured 22 points from their last nine games to become the only promoted team to avoid the drop.

West Ham went through some ups and downs; despite sitting in the top 4 at Christmas, they won just 3 times since then, finishing in 12th, which meant Sam Allardyce lost his job after 4 years, although they did qualify for the Europa League via the Fair Play rankings, ensuring that their last season at the Boleyn Ground will feature European football. Sunderland narrowly avoided relegation for the second year in a row, even though they only spent 2 match days in the bottom 3, a run of 11 points from their last 6 matches under new manager Dick Advocaat confirming their survival. Aston Villa finished 17th, their worst finish in the 20-team Premier League era, though they did manage to get to the FA Cup final.

Queens Park Rangers' return to the Premier League ended in immediate relegation; the club's failure to earn an away point until mid-February proving to be a key factor despite the impressive 18 goals of Charlie Austin. Burnley finished second-bottom, being the lowest goal-scorers in the league and even a shock 1–0 win over Manchester City failing to save them. Hull City filled the last relegation spot, struggling for the majority of the season amidst controversial plans by chairman Assem Allam to change the club's name to Hull Tigers. Newcastle United, whose form sharply plummeted following the departure of Alan Pardew, survived on the last day.

Football League Championship 

In a Championship season marked with constant changes among the top six, AFC Bournemouth completed a turnaround from being within five minutes of liquidation in 2008, to reaching the Premier League for the first time in their history. They remained top for around half the season and snatched the title on the last day to win promotion as champions. This meant that Eddie Howe had achieved the rare feat of taking a club from the fourth tier to the top flight for the first time, an achievement for which he was named the Football League Manager of the Decade.

Despite a spell in which they changed managers four times in 35 days between August and October, Watford found stability under Serbian Slaviša Jokanović and took advantage of slip-ups by other teams to win automatic promotion to the Premier League after an eight-year absence. Securing an immediate return to the Premier League through the play-offs were Norwich City, who beat Middlesbrough in the final; they had topped the standings early on in the season, only to fall to mid-table after a poor run of form within the winter period. Manager Neil Adams ultimately resigned in January, before the appointment of Hamilton boss Alex Neil in January re-invigorated the Canaries' campaign.

Reading endured a season of ups and downs, having first sacked Nigel Adkins in mid-December. This led to former West Bromwich Albion manager Steve Clarke taking over the reins and despite there being an outside chance of relegation going into the last few games, the Royals beat the drop and also reached the FA Cup semi-finals, losing to Arsenal in extra-time. Rotherham United came perilously close to being dropped into the relegation zone in the final weeks after they were deducted three points for fielding an ineligible player, though they ultimately stayed up after the teams below them failed to capitalize on the situation.

Blackpool finished in bottom place (having stayed in that place since September until the end of the season), posting the joint-worst points total for a club in a 24-team second tier, failing to win away once and conceding 91 goals overall. Relegation was not helped by fan protests against owner Owen Oyston's running of the club (eventually culminating in an on-pitch protest that forced their final game of the season to be abandoned), as well as the fact that they had only eight players two weeks before the season started. Wigan Athletic were also relegated, just two years after they had won the FA Cup and played in the Premier League. During the season, they went through three managers and failed to win a home game between September and April as the extra games from the previous season appeared to take its toll on the Latics. Millwall filled the final relegation spot, having sacked Ian Holloway in March and appointed Neil Harris as his replacement, but he couldn't save them from the drop to the third tier.

Football League One 

Bristol City ended their two-year absence from the Championship, topping the division for virtually the entire season and becoming the first club in the country to win promotion. Milton Keynes Dons, the top scorers in any of the four divisions, snatched automatic promotion from under the noses of Preston North End on the final day, winning promotion to the Championship for the first time as the current incarnation of the club; they also enjoyed a famous Football League Cup upset over Manchester United in their first ever meeting. Preston made amends for their last-day slip-up by thrashing Swindon Town in the play-off final to end a five-year absence from the second tier, and in the process finally winning a play-off tournament after nine unsuccessful tries.

Despite being hotly tipped to make an immediate return to the Championship, Yeovil Town spent most of the season rooted to the bottom of the table (and in fact, they were glued to the bottom from February) and they suffered their second successive relegation, finding themselves back in League Two for the first time in a decade after only recording 10 wins in the whole season. Similarly, Leyton Orient were also among the promotion favourites after their play-off final appearance the previous year, but struggled all season, after going through four managers and they ultimately finished second-bottom. Crawley Town were relegated back to League Two after three years at this level; they had appeared to be well out of the reach of relegation but following manager John Gregory stepping down for heart surgery, their form collapsed under Dean Saunders. Notts County filled the final relegation spot, ultimately being cost dear by a disastrous second half of the season after some promising early form.

Crewe Alexandra survived a second relegation battle in a row despite more heavy thrashings in the season, whilst Colchester United's final day win to deny Preston automatic promotion confirmed their survival having been cut adrift for most of the season.

Football League Two 

Just six years after their first ever promotion to the Football League and just missing out on promotion a year earlier, Burton Albion were promoted as champions. While manager Gary Rowett departed for Birmingham City early in the season, his replacement in top-flight legend Jimmy Floyd Hasselbaink guided the club into the top six and then finally promotion. Shrewsbury Town went up in second, securing an instant return to League One; they had actually led the table for much of the season but were made to pay for slip-ups that Burton took advantage of. Taking the third automatic slot in dramatic fashion were Bury, who almost slipped out of the race, but a last-day win over Tranmere Rovers saw the club also promoted. Southend United were forced all the way to extra time and penalties by Wycombe Wanderers, but ultimately scraped past their opponents to take the last promotion spot and secure their place in League One.

Luton Town, on their return to the Football League after five years, just missed out on a playoff place by virtue of Plymouth Argyle's victory over Shrewsbury whilst Portsmouth suffered an even lower league finish than the previous year, finishing in 16th with the club failing to make anything similar to a promotion challenge, but some good run of forms prevented them from being in another relegation battle.

Falling out of the Football League were Tranmere Rovers, who suffered a second relegation in a row and dropped into the Football Conference after 94 years. Cheltenham Town filled the second relegation spot, falling out of the Football League after 16 years; they had started the season reasonably well with 23 points from 14 games, but imploded disastrously after long-serving manager Mark Yates was sacked in favor of Paul Buckle, with not even the late-season arrival of veteran manager Gary Johnson saving them. Hartlepool United had been in the relegation zone for good chunks of the season, but an impressive March saw the club fight their way to safety.

Conference Premier 

A close title race saw Barnet return to the Football League after a two-year absence, which also made them the first club to win promotion to the Football League three times. Pushing them all the way and then winning in the playoffs were Bristol Rovers who secured an immediate return to the Football League, despite being pushed themselves all the way to penalties by Grimsby.

Following the departure of manager Kevin Wilkin late in the previous season, Nuneaton were relegated in bottom place. AFC Telford United were immediately relegated back to the Conference North after being in bottom place for most of the season. Dartford finished third-bottom and experienced the relegation that they only avoided the previous season thanks to the demise of Salisbury City. Alfreton Town filled the final relegation spot and went down on goal difference; they were ultimately cost dear by having the worst defensive record in the division, eventually culminating in a 7-0 thrashing by Bristol Rovers on the final day of the season, when a draw would have been sufficient to prevent relegation.

Cup competitions

FA Cup

Final

League Cup

Final

Community Shield

Football League Trophy

Final

Women's football

FA Women's Cup

Women's Super League

Women's Super League 2

Managerial changes 
This is a list of changes of managers within English league football:

Diary of the season 
 8 August: Blackburn Rovers and Cardiff City play out a 1–1 draw in the opening game of the season, with Kenwyne Jones getting the season's first goal.
 16 August: The Premier League's first fixture sees Swansea defeat Manchester United 2–1. Swansea end the day joint-top with Arsenal, who won their own game against Crystal Palace by the same margin.
 21 August: Crystal Palace sporting director Iain Moody is forced to resign from his position after a team investigating accusations of fraud made by his previous club Cardiff City discover numerous e-mails containing apparently racist, homophobic and anti-semitic insults, sent to and from former Cardiff manager Malky Mackay. The discovery also causes Crystal Palace to confirm that they will not appoint Mackay as their new manager, the position having been vacant since the resignation of Tony Pulis a week prior.  Coventry City confirm that they will return to their former Ricoh Arena ground starting with their home game against Gillingham on 5 September, ending a spell of a little over a year playing at Northampton Town's Sixfields Stadium due to a rent dispute.
 26 August: In the League Cup second round, Manchester United lose 4–0 to League One side Milton Keynes Dons. Three other Premier League sides fall to lower-league opposition, as Burnley are knocked out by Sheffield Wednesday, Leicester City by Shrewsbury Town, and West Ham by Sheffield United.
 28 August: Wayne Rooney is confirmed as the new England captain, following Steven Gerrard's decision to retire from international football.
 31 August: The first month of the Premier League ends with Chelsea leading the table and Swansea and Aston Villa in second and third respectively. Manchester City, Liverpool, Arsenal and Tottenham Hotspur complete the top six. Newly promoted Burnley, stand at the bottom of the table with one point, behind Crystal Palace due to goals scored and one point behind West Bromwich Albion. Nottingham Forest lead the Championship, a point ahead of Watford and newly promoted Wolverhampton Wanderers. The other three play-off spots are occupied by Norwich City, Millwall and Charlton Athletic. The relegation zone is occupied by Bolton Wanderers, Fulham and Blackpool.
 8 September: England's European Championship qualifying campaign begins with a 2–0 away win over  Switzerland, with new Arsenal signing Danny Welbeck scoring both goals.
 20 September: Arsenal score three goals inside four minutes to defeat Aston Villa, with new £16 million striker Danny Welbeck getting his first goal for the club. Newcastle Utd, whose manager Alan Pardew faced a barrage of protests from fans wanting him out of the club, recover from 2–0 down to claim a point against Hull, with Papiss Cissé coming of the bench to score twice in the final 15 minutes. In the evening game, West Ham score twice in the opening seven minutes on their way to defeating Liverpool 3–1. In the Championship, Nottingham Forest remain unbeaten at the top after a 0–0 draw with Millwall. Leeds United, who have now claimed 10 points out of a possible 12 under caretaker manager Neil Redfearn, beat local rivals Huddersfield Town 3–0 at Elland Road. Newly promoted Wolves are now just a point behind Forest after another home win, their third in a row, this time 1–0 over Bolton.
 21 September: West Bromwich Albion secure their first win under Alan Irvine, defeating Tottenham 1–0 at White Hart Lane. Leicester, trailing 3–1 with 20 minutes remaining, defeat Manchester United 5–3 in front of a full house at the King Power stadium. Crystal Palace defeat Everton at Goodison Park 3–2, after falling behind 1–0 inside the opening 15 minutes. Frank Lampard, now on loan at Manchester City, scores an 84th-minute equaliser against his former club, to give ten-men City a point against Chelsea at the Etihad Stadium.
 30 September: The month ends with Chelsea continuing to lead the Premier League, three points ahead of Southampton. Defending champions Manchester City are a further two points behind Southampton, and a point ahead of a clutch of sides including Arsenal, Swansea and Aston Villa. Burnley and Newcastle United, both of whom are without a single win this season, sit bottom of the table, with Newcastle ahead on goals scored alone. Queens Park Rangers make up the bottom three. In the Championship, Norwich have taken over the top of the table, though Nottingham Forest are unbeaten and behind on goal difference. Wolves, Watford, Ipswich and Derby occupy the play-off spots. The bottom three remains unchanged from the previous month, with Blackpool bottom and still winless, and Fulham and Bolton Wanderers ahead of them by only one and two points respectively.
 31 October: October ends with Chelsea still leading the Premier League, four points ahead of Southampton. Manchester City remain in third, while West Ham United stand in fourth. Arsenal, Swansea and Liverpool are behind in the European chase. Newcastle United have moved above QPR and out of the relegation zone, at the expense of their northern rivals Sunderland. Winless Burnley remain at the bottom of the table. Derby County have moved to the top of the Championship, though only goal difference is separating them Watford, Norwich and Wolves. AFC Bournemouth and Middlesbrough are two points behind in fifth and sixth.  Blackpool remain bottom of the Championship. Birmingham City have moved below Bolton, while Fulham has escaped the relegation zone under new manager Kit Symons.
 12 November: The news that Ched Evans, who was convicted of rape in 2012 and given a five-year prison sentence, is being allowed to train with his former club Sheffield United results in TV presenter Charlie Webster resigning as a club ambassador, and sponsors DBL Logistics threatening to terminate their deal with immediate effect should Evans be offered any form of contract by the club.
 30 November: At the end of November, Chelsea continue to lead the Premier League, now six points ahead of second place, which is occupied by Manchester City. Southampton are a point behind in third, while Manchester United take fourth place, with West Ham, Arsenal and Spurs not far behind. Burnley have edged above Leicester to rise off the bottom of the table, and QPR remain in the relegation zone. With the exception of leaders Derby, the Championship's top six has changed since the end of October: Ipswich and Brentford have risen to joint second (Ipswich leading on goal difference), AFC Bournemouth and Middlesbrough have each risen a place, and Blackburn have moved into sixth place. Although Bolton and Birmingham have escaped the relegation zone, Blackpool have had no such luck and remain bottom, now joined by two teams that reached the play-offs last season, Wigan (23rd) and Brighton.
 10 December: Hereford United, currently playing in the Southern League Premier Division, are suspended "from all football activity" with immediate effect by The Football Association following failure to respond to questions from an Independent Regulatory Commission.
 11 December: The suspension of Hereford United from all footballing activities is lifted.
 19 December: Hereford United go out of business and are forced to resign from the Southern League. The club had been in existence for 90 years, played in the Football League from 1972 to 1997 and again between 2006 and 2012.
 31 December: As the year closes, Manchester City have begun to whittle away at Chelsea's lead at the top of the table and are now three points behind. A losing streak has seen Southampton drop behind Manchester United into fourth. Arsenal have climbed above West Ham, but the top seven remains unchanged, as is the relegation zone, except for Crystal Palace replacing QPR in 18th. In the Championship, Derby have slipped behind leaders AFC Bournemouth and second-placed Ipswich, and Blackburn has been replaced in the top six by Watford, who have knocked Brentford down to sixth. Millwall have replaced Brighton in the relegation zone, but it otherwise remains unchanged from the end of November.
 23 January: Cambridge United, newly promoted back to the Football League for this season, manage to hold Manchester United to a 0–0 draw in the fourth round of the FA Cup, forcing a replay at Old Trafford.
 24 January: The FA Cup sees Chelsea eliminated by League One side Bradford City, Manchester City knocked out by Championship side Middlesbrough, Southampton eliminated by Premier League side Crystal Palace, Tottenham Hotspur eliminated by the top-flight's basement side Leicester City, and Swansea knocked out by Championship team Blackburn Rovers. Liverpool and Sunderland are also held to goal-less draws by Championship sides Bolton Wanderers and Fulham respectively.
 31 January: By the end of January Chelsea have restored their five-point lead over Manchester City. The top four remains unchanged, while West Ham dropped out of the top seven, to be replaced by Liverpool. Burnley stand in 17th, ahead of Hull, QPR and Leicester. In the Championship, Derby have returned to second place, a point ahead of Middlesbrough and separated from AFC Bournemouth by goal difference. In the promotion race, Ipswich, Brentford and Watford are a few points behind. Millwall, Wigan and Blackpool remain in the bottom three.
 28 February: February ends with Chelsea five points ahead of Manchester City. Manchester United remain third, while Southampton have slipped behind Arsenal in fifth. Liverpool and Spurs also remain in the top seven. Leicester remain stuck to the foot of the table, but Hull and QPR have climbed clear at the expense of Burnley and Aston Villa. The Championship promotion race has eight points separating leaders Derby and eighth-placed Wolves. AFC Bournemouth have slumped in recent weeks to slip behind Middlesbrough and Watford, while both Ipswich and Norwich can overtake the South Coast side if they win their games in hand. Brentford have fallen to seventh. The bottom three remains unchanged from the end of January.
 1 March: Chelsea defeat Tottenham Hotspur 2–0 at Wembley Stadium in the League Cup Final, winning the first major trophy of the season. It is their fifth League Cup trophy, and the first trophy won by the club since José Mourinho returned as manager in 2013.
 22 March: Bristol City defeat Walsall 2–0 at Wembley Stadium in the League Trophy Final, winning it for a record third time.
 31 March: Chelsea ended the month still top of the Premier League table, 6 points ahead of Manchester City with a game in hand. Manchester City's shock defeat to Burnley coupled with Arsenal's good run of form saw them trail City by only a single point and also a point ahead of Manchester United in fourth. Liverpool, Southampton, and Tottenham Hotspur occupy the top seven. Although Burnley defeated Manchester City earlier in the month, they stay in the bottom three with QPR and Leicester, who are still rock bottom. AFC Bournemouth reoccupy top spot in the Championship and followed closely by Watford in second. Middlesbrough, Norwich, Derby, and Ipswich complete the top six. Brentford and Wolves are still in the hunt for a playoff spot as only 8 points separate first to eighth. Wigan move above Millwall in the bottom three and Blackpool still rooted to the bottom, 17 points adrift with only 7 games left.
 6 April: Blackpool's relegation to League One is confirmed by Rotherham United's victory over Brighton & Hove Albion, while Wigan Athletic sack manager Malky Mackay.
 25 April: Watford confirm promotion to the Premier League for the first time since 2007 after a 2–0 away victory at Brighton, followed by Middlesbrough's 3–4 loss at Fulham and Norwich's failure to win at Rotherham.
 27 April: AFC Bournemouth confirm their first ever promotion to the Premier League with a 3–0 home win over Bolton. However, Middlesbrough can still draw level on points, but, as Charlton Athletic's Twitter feed pithily points out, AFC Bournemouth would need to lose 19–0 at Charlton in the final round for Middlesbrough to be able to overcome their superior goal difference.
 30 April: A poor run of form from Manchester City has not been enough for them to concede second place, but their hopes of retaining the title are over with Chelsea only needing one more win from their last four matches to avoid being caught by third-placed Arsenal, who are behind City only on goal difference and a whopping 13 points behind Chelsea despite their game in hand. Manchester United, despite inconsistent form, appear to have fourth place secured with their nearest rivals Liverpool and Tottenham seven points behind. Southampton's push for European football continues as they are only a point behind Liverpool and Spurs with a superior goal difference to either. At the bottom, Leicester have gone on a four-match winning streak to escape the relegation zone and looked poised to become only the third team in Premier League history to avoid relegation after being bottom on Christmas Day, despite 18th-placed Sunderland having a game in hand. Salvation for Sunderland and the other teams avoiding relegation may yet appear in the form of Newcastle, who are five points ahead of Sunderland but have lost their past six league matches. It appears to be too late for Burnley (now bottom) and QPR, however, and it is almost certain that both will be returning to the Championship next season. With one game left in the Championship, the automatic promotion spots have been all but decided and Middlesbrough and Norwich have confirmed their places in the play-offs. The only remaining question is whether Ipswich and Derby will slip up to let Brentford and Wolves into the last two play-off places. Despite Rotherham's point deduction, Millwall and Wigan have failed to capitalise and both will join Blackpool in the third tier next season.
 2 May: AFC Bournemouth win 3–0 at Charlton to pip Watford to the Championship title following the latter letting slip their lead in the last minute at home to Sheffield Wednesday. Derby's capitulation concludes with a 3–0 home defeat by Reading allowing Brentford and Ipswich to claim the final two play-off places ahead of the Rams, who finish eighth.
 9 May: Leicester, Sunderland, and Aston Villa won their games, while Newcastle ended their eight-match losing run after they drew against West Brom. All these results combined to relegate Burnley to the Championship despite their 1–0 win against Hull City.
 10 May: QPR's relegation to the Championship is confirmed after a 6–0 thrashing at the hands of Manchester City.
 16 May: Following Middlesbrough's victory over Brentford in their play-off semi-final the previous evening, Norwich are confirmed as Boro's opponents at Wembley after they beat local rivals Ipswich in the other semi-final.
 24 May: In the final day of this Premier League season, Hull City suffer relegation after they can only draw 0–0 against Manchester United. Ultimately though, even a win won't be enough for the Tigers because Newcastle's 2–0 win against West Ham was enough to confirm their Premier League status for another season. Meanwhile, Tottenham pushed their way to fifth place and Europa League group stage qualification with a 1–0 win away to Everton, combined with Stoke's 6–1 win over Liverpool, their worst defeat since 1963.
 23 May: In the League 2 play-off final Southend score an injury-time equalizer and then beat Wycombe on penalties to earn promotion to League 1 after 5 years in the basement tier.
 24 May: Preston thrash Swindon 4–0 in the League 1 play-off final and return to the Championship after a four-year absence.
 25 May: Norwich secure an instant return to the Premier League following a comfortable 2–0 victory over Middlesbrough in the Championship play-off final.
 26 May: West Ham's final season at the Boleyn Ground will feature European football as the Londoners will play in the 2015–16 UEFA Europa League after qualifying through the UEFA Respect Fair Play ranking initiative.
 29 May: F.C. United of Manchester open their new Broadhurst Park ground with a match against Benfica. The Portuguese club run out 1–0 winners.
 30 May: Arsenal put four without reply past Aston Villa in the 2015 FA Cup Final at Wembley. This result has significance in Hampshire, as Arsenal's victory, combined with the Gunners' league finish of third, sees Southampton qualify for Europe for the first time since 2003. The Saints will enter the 2015–16 Europa League at the third qualifying round.

Clubs dissolved

Deaths 

 1 June 2014: Brian Farmer, 80, Birmingham City and Bournemouth & Boscombe Athletic right back.
 13 June 2014: Willie Harvey, 84, Bradford Park Avenue inside forward.
 24 June 2014: John Fantham, 75, England, Sheffield Wednesday and Rotherham United inside forward.
 3 July 2014: David Jones, 79, Swansea Town goalkeeper.
 5 July 2014: Brian Wood, 73, Crystal Palace, Leyton Orient, Colchester United and Workington defender.
 6 July 2014: Peter Kearns, 77, former Plymouth Argyle, Aldershot and Lincoln City inside forward.
 19 July 2014: Ray King, 89, former Port Vale goalkeeper.
 22 July 2014: Morris Stevenson, 71, former Luton Town inside forward.
 23 July 2014: Jordan Tabor, 23, former Cheltenham Town defender.
 28 July 2014: Alex Forbes, 89, former Scotland, Sheffield United, Arsenal, Leyton Orient and Fulham wing half.
 31 July 2014: Jeff Bourne, 66, Derby County, Crystal Palace and Sheffield United forward 
 6 August 2014: Jimmy Walsh, 84, former Leicester City striker.
 21 August 2014: Don Clark, 96, former Bristol City forward.
 10 September 2014: David Whyte, 43, former Crystal Palace, Charlton Athletic, Ipswich Town, Bristol Rovers and Southend United striker.
 28 September 2014: Tim Rawlings, 81, former Walsall and Port Vale half-back.
 29 September 2014: Len Stephenson, 84, former Blackpool, Port Vale and Oldham Athletic forward.
 5 October 2014: John Best, 74, former USA and Tranmere Rovers defender.
 19 October 2014: Arnold Mitchell, 84, former Notts County and Exeter City right half.
 19 October 2014: Don Ratcliffe, 79, former Stoke City, Middlesbrough, Darlington and Crewe Alexandra winger.
 21 October 2014: Jim Barrett, Jr., 83, former West Ham United, Nottingham Forest and Birmingham City inside forward. 
 24 October 2014: Martin Garratt, 34, former York City, Mansfield Town and Lincoln City midfielder.
 24 October 2014: Malcolm Thompson, 68, former Hartlepool United and Scarborough striker.
 29 October 2014: Klas Ingesson, 46, former Sweden and Sheffield Wednesday midfielder.
 30 October 2014: Joe Brown, 85, former Middlesbrough, Burnley, AFC Bournemouth & Boscombe Athletic and Aldershot left half and manager of Burnley.
 3 November 2014: Geoff Cox, 79, former Birmingham City and Torquay United winger.
 3 November 2014: Ivor Seemley, 85, former Sheffield Wednesday, Stockport County and Chesterfield left back.
 4 November 2014: Derek Hogg, 84, former Leicester City, West Bromwich Albion and Cardiff City outside left.
 4 November 2014: Eddie Stuart, 83, former Wolverhampton Wanderers, Stoke City, Tranmere Rovers and Stockport County defender.
 5 November 2014: Roy Hartle, 83, former Bolton Wanderers full back.
 7 November 2014: Alex Bain, 78, former Huddersfield Town, Chesterfield and AFC Bournemouth forward.
 8 November 2014: Sammy Wilson, 82, former Millwall inside left.
 13 November 2014: Jim Storrie, 74, former Leeds United, Rotherham United and Portsmouth forward.
 15 November 2014: Valéry Mézague, 30, former Cameroon, Portsmouth and Bury midfielder.
 20 November 2014: Iain Hesford, 54, former Blackpool, Sunderland, Hull City and Maidstone United goalkeeper.
 23 November 2014: John Neal, 82, former Hull City, Swindon Town, Aston Villa and Southend United defender, who also managed Wrexham, Middlesbrough and Chelsea.
 26 November 2014: Malcolm Finlayson, 84, former Millwall and Wolverhampton Wanderers goalkeeper.
 November 2014: Reg Foulkes, 91, former Walsall and Norwich City defender.
 November 2014: Albert Jackson, 71, former Oldham Athletic defender.
 7 December 2014: Tommy Todd, 88, former Crewe Alexandra, Derby County and Rochdale forward.
 19 December 2014: Pat Holton, 78, former Chelsea and Southend United defender.
 27 December 2014: Ron Henry, 80, former England and Tottenham Hotspur defender.
 31 December 2014: Jimmy Dunn, 91, former Wolverhampton Wanderers and Derby County inside forward.
 January 2015: John McPhee, 77, former Blackpool, Barnsley and Southport defender 
 8 January 2015: Sam Morris, 84, former Chester City wing half.
 10 January 2015: Roger Wosahlo, 67, former Chelsea, Ipswich Town and Peterborough United winger.
 11 January 2015: Albert McPherson, 87, former Walsall centre half, who also went on to coach at West Bromwich Albion.
 13 January 2015: Sir Jack Hayward, 91, former Wolverhampton Wanderers owner.
 14 January 2015: Danny Malloy, 84, former Cardiff City and Doncaster Rovers defender.
 16 January 2015: Bill Dodd, 78, former Workington forward.
 19 January 2015: Ken Furphy, 83, former Darlington, Workington and Watford defender, who also had spells in management with Workington, Watford, Blackburn Rovers and Sheffield United.
 25 January 2015: Ian Towers, 74, former Burnley, Oldham Athletic and Bury striker.
 30 January 2015: Harold Hassall, 85, former England, Huddersfield Town and Bolton Wanderers forward.
 2 February 2015: Roy Little, 83, former Manchester City, Brighton & Hove Albion and Crystal Palace defender.
 9 February 2015: Nick Sharkey, 71, former Sunderland, Leicester City, Mansfield Town and Hartlepool United forward.
 10 February 2015: Tom McQueen, 85, former Accrington Stanley goalkeeper.
 February 2015: Geoff Morris, 65, former Walsall, Shrewsbury Town and Port Vale winger.
 3 March 2015: Dave Mackay, 80, former Scotland, Tottenham Hotspur, Derby County and Swindon Town left half, who also had spells in management with Swindon Town, Nottingham Forest, Derby County, Walsall, Doncaster Rovers and Birmingham City.
 3 March 2015: Roy McCrohan, 84, former Reading, Norwich City, Colchester United and Bristol Rovers wing half.
 25 March 2015: Jimmy McGill, 68, former Arsenal, Huddersfield Town, Hull City and Halifax Town midfielder.
 25 March 2015: Ron Suart, 94, former Blackpool and Blackburn Rovers defender, who also managed Scunthorpe & Lindsay United, Blackpool and Chelsea.
 26 March 2015: Ian Moir, 71, former Manchester United, Blackpool, Chester City, Wrexham and Shrewsbury Town midfielder.
 4 April 2015: Bill Ellerington, 91, former England and Southampton full back.
 7 April 2015: Harry Dowd, 76, former Manchester City and Oldham Athletic goalkeeper.
 8 April 2015: Billy Ronson, 58, former Blackpool, Cardiff City, Wrexham and Barnsley midfielder.
 10 April 2015: Ray Treacy, 68, former Republic of Ireland, West Bromwich Albion, Charlton Athletic, Swindon Town and Preston North End striker.
 21 April 2015: Dave Walker, 73, former Burnley and Southampton defender.
 24 April 2015: Ken Birch, 81, former Everton and Southampton right half.
 27 April 2015: Chris Turner, 64, former Peterborough United, Luton Town, Cambridge United. Swindon Town and Southend United defender who also managed Cambridge United and Peterborough United.
 29 April 2015: Gary Liddell, 60, former Leeds United, Grimsby Town and Doncaster Rovers forward.
 1 May 2015: Colin Whitaker, 82, former Sheffield Wednesday, Bradford Park Avenue, Shrewsbury Town, Queens Park Rangers, Rochdale, Oldham Athletic and Barrow winger.
 11 May 2015: John Hewie, 87, former Scotland and Charlton Athletic left back.
 21 May 2015: Ernie Hannigan, 72, former Preston North End, Coventry City and Torquay United outside right.
 21 May 2015: Alan Woodward, 68, former Sheffield United winger.
 27 May 2015: Andy King, 58, former Luton Town, Everton, Queens Park Rangers, West Bromwich Albion, Wolverhampton Wanderers and Aldershot midfielder, who also managed Mansfield Town and Swindon Town.
 30 May 2015: Tony McNamara, 85, former Everton, Liverpool, Crewe Alexandra and Bury winger.

Retirements 

 13 June 2014: David Bentley, 29, former England, Arsenal, Blackburn Rovers and Tottenham Hotspur midfielder.
 19 June 2014: Phil Bolland, 37, former Oxford United, Peterborough United, Chester City and Wrexham defender.
 25 June 2014: Danny Carlton, 30, former Carlisle United, Bury and Morecambe striker.
 25 June 2014: Mike Pollitt, 42, former Lincoln City, Darlington, Notts County, Rotherham United, Chesterfield and Wigan Athletic goalkeeper.
 June 2014: Josh Low, 35, former Bristol Rovers, Leyton Orient, Cardiff City, Oldham Athletic, Northampton Town, Leicester City, Peterborough United and Cheltenham Town midfielder.
 1 July 2014: Gary Alexander, 34, former Swindon Town, Hull City, Leyton Orient, Millwall, Brentford, Crawley Town and Burton Albion striker.
 4 July 2014: Guy Branston, 35, former Rotherham United, Sheffield Wednesday, Oldham Athletic, Peterborough United, Notts County, Burton Albion, Torquay United, Bradford City, Aldershot Town and Plymouth Argyle defender.
 17 July 2014: Martin Petrov, 35, former Bulgaria, Manchester City and Bolton Wanderers midfielder.
 21 July 2014: Leon Cort, 34, former Southend United, Hull City, Crystal Palace, Stoke City, Burnley and Charlton Athletic defender.
 22 July 2014: Dave Kitson, 34, former Cambridge United, Reading, Stoke City, Portsmouth, Sheffield United and Oxford United striker.
 27 August 2014: Manuel Almunia, 37, former Arsenal and Watford goalkeeper.
 22 September 2014: Adam Drury, 36, former Peterborough United, Norwich City and Leeds United defender.
 16 October 2014: William Gallas, 37, former France, Chelsea, Arsenal and Tottenham Hotspur defender.
 18 October 2014: Nick Culkin, 36, former Manchester United and Queens Park Rangers goalkeeper.
 28 October 2014: Chris Iwelumo, 36, former Scotland, Stoke City, Colchester United, Charlton Athletic, Wolverhampton Wanderers, Burnley and Watford forward.
 29 October 2014: Clive Platt, 37, former Walsall, Rochdale, Notts County, Peterborough United, Milton Keynes Dons, Colchester United, Coventry City, Northampton Town and Bury forward.
 19 November 2014: Peter Løvenkrands, 34, former Denmark, Newcastle United and Birmingham City forward.
 1 December 2014: Byron Anthony, 30, former Cardiff City, Bristol Rovers, Hereford United and Newport County defender.
 3 December 2014: Matthew Etherington, 33, former Peterborough United, Tottenham Hotspur, West Ham United and Stoke City midfielder.
 16 December 2014: Thierry Henry, 37, former France and Arsenal striker, who holds the record number of goals scored for Arsenal.
 18 December 2014: Gary Doherty, 34, former Republic of Ireland, Luton Town, Tottenham Hotspur, Norwich City, Charlton Athletic and Wycombe Wanderers defender/striker.
 29 January 2015: Lloyd Owusu, 38, former Ghana, Brentford, Sheffield Wednesday, Reading, Yeovil Town, Cheltenham Town and Barnet forward.
 3 February 2015: Eddie Oshodi, 23, former Watford defender.
 28 February 2015: Gary Caldwell, 32, former Scotland and Wigan Athletic defender.
 2 March 2015: Jordan Seabright, 20, former AFC Bournemouth and Dagenham & Redbridge goalkeeper.
 3 March 2015: Bradley Orr, 32, former Bristol City, Queens Park Rangers and Blackburn Rovers defender.
 7 March 2015: David Connolly, 37, former Republic of Ireland, Watford, Wimbledon, West Ham United, Leicester City, Wigan Athletic, Sunderland, Southampton, Portsmouth and AFC Wimbledon striker.
 8 April 2015: Barry Ferguson, 37, former Scotland, Blackburn Rovers, Birmingham City and Blackpool midfielder.
 23 April 2015: Marc Tierney, 29, former Oldham Athletic, Shrewsbury Town, Colchester United, Norwich City and Bolton Wanderers defender
 2 May 2015: Richard Lee, 32, former Watford and Brentford goalkeeper.
 2 May 2015: Stewart Drummond, 39, former Chester City, Shrewsbury Town and Morecambe midfielder, who is Morecambe's record appearance holder in the Football League.
 2 May 2015: Kevin Miller, 46, former Exeter City, Birmingham City, Watford, Crystal Palace, Barnsley, Bristol Rovers and Southampton goalkeeper.
 7 May 2015: Russell Anderson, 36, former Scotland, Sunderland and Derby County defender.
 12 May 2015: Andy Whing, 30, former Coventry City, Brighton & Hove Albion, Leyton Orient and Oxford United defender.
 14 May 2015: Chris Sedgwick, 35, former Rotherham United, Preston North End, Sheffield Wednesday, Scunthorpe United and Bury midfielder.
 24 May 2015: Brad Friedel, 44, former USA, Liverpool, Blackburn Rovers, Aston Villa and Tottenham Hotspur goalkeeper.
 24 May 2015: Steven Reid, 34, former Republic of Ireland, Millwall, Blackburn Rovers, West Bromwich Albion and Burnley utility player.
 26 May 2015: Kevin O'Connor, 33, former Brentford utility player, who spent over 16 years at Griffin Park.
 30 May 2015: Rio Ferdinand, 36, former England, West Ham United, Leeds United, Manchester United and Queens Park Rangers defender, who also captained England on a number of occasions.

Notes

References